"Yasei no Energy" is the thirty-fifth single by B'z, released on July 16, 2003. This song is one of B'z's many number-one singles in Oricon charts.

Track listing 
 - 4:39
 - 3:00

Certifications

References 
B'z performance at Oricon

External links 
B'z official website

2003 singles
B'z songs
Oricon Weekly number-one singles
Songs written by Tak Matsumoto
Songs written by Koshi Inaba
2003 songs